Fred Dickinson Letts (April 26, 1875 – January 19, 1965) was a United States representative from Iowa, and a United States district judge of the United States District Court for the District of Columbia.

Education and career

Born on April 26, 1875, in Ainsworth, Washington County, Iowa, Letts attended the common schools of Washington County. He attended Columbia University, then received a Bachelor of Science degree in 1897 from Parsons College in Fairfield, Iowa, and a Bachelor of Laws in 1899 from the University of Iowa College of Law and was admitted to the bar that year. He entered private practice in Davenport, Iowa from 1899 to 1911, returning briefly to private practice from 1912 to 1914. He was a Judge of the Iowa District Court for the Second Judicial District from 1911 to 1912, and from 1914 to 1925.

Congressional service

Letts was elected as a Republican from Iowa's 2nd congressional district to the United States House of Representatives of the 69th, 70th, and 71st United States Congresses, serving from March 4, 1925, until March 3, 1931. He was an unsuccessful for reelection in 1930 to the 72nd United States Congress.

Federal judicial service

Letts received a recess appointment from President Herbert Hoover on May 5, 1931, to an Associate Justice seat on the Supreme Court of the District of Columbia (Associate Justice of the District Court of the United States for the District of Columbia from June 25, 1936, Judge of the United States District Court for the District of Columbia from June 25, 1948) vacated by Associate Justice Wendell Philips Stafford. He was nominated to the same position by President Hoover on December 15, 1931. He was confirmed by the United States Senate on February 17, 1932, and received his commission on February 20, 1932. He served as Chief Judge from 1958 to 1959. He assumed senior status on May 31, 1961. His service terminated on January 19, 1965, due to his death in Washington, D.C. He was interred in Ainsworth Cemetery in Ainsworth, Iowa.

Family

Letts was a cousin of former Iowa United States Senator and United States Representative Lester J. Dickinson of Algona, Iowa, who was also serving in the United States House of Representatives during Lett's two terms.

References

Sources
 
 

1875 births
1965 deaths
People from Ainsworth, Iowa
Iowa state court judges
Judges of the United States District Court for the District of Columbia
United States district court judges appointed by Herbert Hoover
20th-century American judges
Parsons College alumni
University of Iowa College of Law alumni
Republican Party members of the United States House of Representatives from Iowa
Politicians from Davenport, Iowa